The St. Patrick's Catholic Church in West Pointe a'la Hache, Louisiana is a historic Roman Catholic church.  It is located at 21997 LA 23, on the west bank of the Mississippi River.

The wood-frame building was constructed in 1918 and added to the National Register of Historic Places in 1999.

It was built in 1918 to replace a previous church destroyed by a hurricane in 1915.  The church includes some elements of Gothic Revival architecture.  It used some materials salvaged from the former church.

The church was moved a short distance in 1937, from the east side of Louisiana Highway 23 in Port Sulphur to the west side.  And it was somewhat enlarged then.

It was moved upriver its current location in Woodland Plantation in 1998 and a further addition to the church was then added.

The current St. Patrick's Catholic Church is a masonry structure built in 1954 to replace the wood-frame church.  It is located in front of the former site of the wood frame one.

References

Roman Catholic churches in Louisiana
Churches on the National Register of Historic Places in Louisiana
Gothic Revival church buildings in Louisiana
Roman Catholic churches completed in 1918
Churches in Plaquemines Parish, Louisiana
National Register of Historic Places in Plaquemines Parish, Louisiana
20th-century Roman Catholic church buildings in the United States